How Deep Is Your Love or How Deep Is Your Love? may refer to:

 "How Deep Is Your Love" (Bee Gees song), 1977
 "How Deep Is Your Love" (Dru Hill song), 1998
 "How Deep Is Your Love?" (The Rapture song), 2011
 "How Deep Is Your Love" (Sean Paul song), 2012
 "How Deep Is Your Love" (Calvin Harris and Disciples song), 2015 
 "How Deep Is Your Love", a 1992 song by Thomas Anders
 "How Deep Is Your Love", a 1996 song by Take That, a cover version of the Bee Gees song